Nizam (from  / niẓām, meaning "organizer") was the title of the sovereign of Hyderabad State and other Indian States. These rulers ruled under the kingship of Mughals. After Mughals British rulers let them continue in English rule.

See also
Nizam of Hyderabad
Tipu Sultan

Titles in India
Titles of national or ethnic leadership